Armando Poggioli (14 June 1888 – 10 January 1967) was an Italian discus thrower and hammer thrower who competed at the 1924, 1928 and 1932 Summer Olympics.

National titles
He won five times the national championships at senior level.

Italian Athletics Championships
Hammer throw: 1926, 1927, 1928, 1929, 1930 (5)

References

External links
 

1888 births
1967 deaths
Sportspeople from Modena
Athletes (track and field) at the 1924 Summer Olympics
Athletes (track and field) at the 1928 Summer Olympics
Athletes (track and field) at the 1932 Summer Olympics
Italian male discus throwers
Italian male hammer throwers
Olympic athletes of Italy
20th-century Italian people